St. Luke's University Health Network (SLUHN) is a non-profit network of 12 hospitals and over 300 outpatient sites. The health network is headquartered in Bethlehem, Pennsylvania in the Lehigh Valley region of eastern Pennsylvania and has over 16,000 employees.

History
The network started in 1872 with St. Luke's Hospital, now known as St. Luke's University Hospital, which became a primary teaching hospital for Temple University School of Medicine in 1901. St. Luke's University Hospital is a non-profit, tertiary-care, teaching hospital with campuses in Allentown and Bethlehem in Lehigh County, Pennsylvania.

Specialties
St. Luke's University Health Network is a member of the Council of Teaching Hospitals and Health Systems.

The network offers 90 medical specialties, including:
 Level I (Bethlehem), Level II Trauma (Easton) and Level IV (Miners and Upper Bucks) Adult Trauma Center
 Bariatric surgery
 Cardiology and cardiovascular surgery. A nationally recognized open-heart surgery program
 Gastroenterology: colonoscopy, upper and lower endoscopic surgery, hernia repairs, bowel diseases 
 Neuroscience
 Oncology: Radiation Oncology, Chemotherapy, Laser therapy
 Orthopaedics
 Otorhinolaryngology
 Pediatrics
 Perinatal
 Robotic/Minimally-invasive surgery
 Radiology
 Podiatry
 Women's Health: breast cancer surgery

Locations
St. Luke's University Health Network comprises twelve hospitals:
 
St. Luke's University Hospital and Temple University School of Medicine–Bethlehem (Fountain Hill)
St. Luke's Allentown Campus (Allentown)
St. Luke's Anderson Campus (Bethlehem Township)
St Luke's Easton (Easton) starting July 1, 2020, formerly Easton Hospital 
St. Luke's Miners Campus (Coaldale) 
St. Luke's Monroe Campus (Stroudsburg)
St. Luke's Upper Bucks Campus (Quakertown)
St. Luke's Warren Campus (Phillipsburg, NJ) 
St. Luke's Lehighton Campus (Lehighton)
St. Luke's Sacred Heart Campus (Allentown)
St. Luke's Quakertown Campus (Quakertown)
Geisinger St. Luke's Hospital (Orwigsburg)

In addition, the network's 300 outpatient sites provide various healthcare services, including:

 Outpatient testing and service facilities
 A regional medical school campus
 Home health
 Physical therapy, occupational therapy, and audiology
 Hospice services (inpatient and outpatient)
 Level III NICU

References

External links
 

1872 establishments in Pennsylvania
Bethlehem, Pennsylvania
Healthcare in Pennsylvania
Hospital networks in the United States
Hospitals in the Lehigh Valley
Medical and health organizations based in Pennsylvania
Trauma centers